Faristenia omelkoi is a moth in the family Gelechiidae. It is found in the Russian Far East, Korea, Japan (Honshu) and Taiwan.

The wingspan is 13-13.5 mm. The forewings are fuscous with several yellowish white patches before and beyond a dark fuscous central costal patch. There are also several irregularly scattered dark streaks. The hindwings are pale grey.

The larvae feed on Quercus mongolica.

References

Faristenia
Moths described in 1991